The Mauritian Cup  is the top knockout tournament of the Mauritian football. It was created in 1957 by the Mauritius Football Association.

Winners
 1957 : FC Dodo (Curepipe) 5-2 Fire Brigade SC (Beau Bassin-Rose Hill)
 1959 : Faucon Flacq 2-0 Fire Brigade SC (Beau Bassin-Rose Hill)
 1960 : FC Dodo (Curepipe) 1-0 Faucon Flacq
 1961 : FC Dodo (Curepipe) 1-1 2-0 Faucon Flacq
 1962 : Police Club 2-1 FC Dodo (Curepipe)
 1963 : Police Club 5-4 Fire Brigade SC (Beau Bassin-Rose Hill)
 1964 : no cup
 1965 : Police Club (Port Louis) 4-2 Muslim Scouts Club (Port Louis)
 1966 : FC Dodo (Curepipe) 2-2 3-0 Fire Brigade SC (Beau Bassin-Rose Hill)
 1967 : Faucon Flacq bt Police Club (Port Louis)
 1968 : Police Club (Port Louis)
 1969 : Muslim Scouts 2-0 Police Club (Port Louis)
no cup between 1970 and 1976
 1977 : Muslim Scouts 1-0 Police Club (Port Louis)
no cup between 1978 and 1979
 1980 : Fire Brigade SC (Beau Bassin-Rose Hill) 1-0 Police Club (Port Louis)
 1981 : Fire Brigade SC (Beau Bassin-Rose Hill) 3-1 Hindu Cadets (Quatre Bornes)
 1982 : Fire Brigade SC (Beau Bassin-Rose Hill) 1-0 Police Club (Port Louis)
 1983 : Fire Brigade SC (Beau Bassin-Rose Hill) 1-0 Fuel Youth
 1984 : Police Club (Port Louis)
 1985 : Sunrise (Flacq)
 1986 : Fire Brigade SC (Beau Bassin-Rose Hill)
 1987 : Sunrise 2-1 Racing
 1988 : Cadets Club (Quatre Bornes) 1-0 Fuel Youth
 1989 : Fire Brigade SC (Beau Bassin-Rose Hill) 5-0 Cadets Club (Quatre Bornes)
 1990 : Fire Brigade SC (Beau Bassin-Rose Hill) 7-0 Cadets Club (Quatre Bornes)
 1991 : Fire Brigade SC (Beau Bassin-Rose Hill) 1-0 RBBS (or Scouts Club)
 1992 : Sunrise 2-0 Cadets Club (Quatre Bornes)
 1993 : Sunrise 2-1 Scouts Club (Port Louis)
 1994 : Fire Brigade SC (Beau Bassin-Rose Hill) 3-0 Cadets Club (Quatre Bornes)
 1995 : Fire Brigade SC (Beau Bassin-Rose Hill) 2-1 Cadets Club (Quatre Bornes)
 1996 : Sunrise (Flacq) 2-1 Scouts Club (Port Louis)
 1997 : Fire Brigade SC (Beau Bassin-Rose Hill) 3-1 Sunrise (Flacq)
 1998 : Fire Brigade SC (Beau Bassin-Rose Hill) 3-0 Scouts Club (Port Louis)
 1999 : abandoned
 2001 : Union Sportive de Beau-Bassin Rose-Hill 2-1 Olympique de Moka
 2002 : AS Port-Louis 2000 3-0 Olympique de Moka
 2003 : Savanne SC 1-1 (4 t.a.b. à 2) AS Port-Louis 2000
 2004 : Savanne SC 3-2 Faucon Flacq
 2005 : AS Port-Louis 2000 2-0 Pointe-aux-Sables Mates
 2006 : Curepipe Starlight SC 0-0 (9 t.a.b. à 8) Savanne SC
 2007 : Petite Rivière Noire SC 2-0 AS Port-Louis 2000
 2008 : Curepipe Starlight SC 4-2 (aet) AS de Vacoas-Phoenix
 2009 : Pamplemousses SC 6-1 Etoile de L'Ouest
 2010 : AS de Vacoas-Phoenix 1-0 Pointe-aux-Sables Mates
 2011-12: not known
 2013: Curepipe Starlight SC 3-2 Petite Rivière Noire SC
 2014 : Petite Rivière Noire SC 3-1 (aet) Pamplemousses SC
 2015 : Petite Rivière Noire SC 2-0 Pamplemousses SC
 2016 : Pamplemousses SC 2-1 Petite Rivière Noire SC
 2017 : AS Port-Louis 2000 2-0 Pamplemousses SC
 2018 : Pamplemousses SC 2-1 GRSE Wanderers
 2019 : Roche-Bois Bolton City 2-0 AS de Vacoas-Phoenix

References

 
Football competitions in Mauritius
National association football cups